Debattama Saha is an Indian actress in Bengali and Hindi television known for her roles in E Amar Guru Dakshina, Ishaaron Ishaaron Mein and Shaurya Aur Anokhi Ki Kahani.

Early life 
Debattama Saha is originally from Silchar, Assam. She has said that as a child, her mother arranged for her to train as a singer and dancer secretly, due to the objection of her father. She completed her studies from Don Bosco High School, Silchar and graduated in English Honours from Amity University, Kolkata.

Career 
Saha started her career in 2016 with Colors Bangla's  E Amar Gurudakshina. She played role of Shoi/Uma/Nayantara opposite Suman Dey and Biswarup Bandhopadhyay. She has also applied her training as a dancer.

In 2019, she made Hindi TV debut with Sony TV's Ishaaron Ishaaron Mein as a parallel lead role of Dr. Parineeti Ganguly opposite Mudit Nayar and Simran Pareenja. She both performed and helped choreograph the dance in the promotional video for the show.

From 2020 to 2021, she played the lead role of Anokhi Bhalla in the StarPlus television series Shaurya Aur Anokhi Ki Kahani opposite Karanvir Sharma.

In 2021, after the end of Shaurya Aur Anokhi Ki Kahani, she also sang Jo Tera Howega in which she featured with her co-star Karanvir Sharma, who also directed the video. . She was also seen in the music video Aankhein Band Karke and Mubarak Ho with Karanvir Sharma. 

In 2022, she was seen as Mithai in the Zee TV television series Mithai.

Filmography

Television

Music videos

References

External links 

Living people
Indian television actresses
Indian soap opera actresses
Actresses in Hindi television
21st-century Indian actresses
Year of birth missing (living people)